Reinhart Fuchs (September 28, 1934, Berlin – December 16, 2017, Berlin) was a German chess player, international master (1962).

In the national team of the GDR party of six Chess Olympiads (1956–1966) and IV European team championship (1970) in Kapfenberg.

References

External links

Reinhart Fuchs at Chessgames.com

1934 births
2017 deaths
Chess International Masters
German chess players
Chess Olympiad competitors
East German chess players
Sportspeople from Berlin